Anamor is an Italian singer and actress with Cuban descent who is pursuing a singing career in Spain.

She debuted as an actress in the 1984 Sergio Leone movie Once Upon a Time in America. She has produced works such as "De lo tanto que te amo", which translates to I Love You So Much. She also sang Memelo.

List of albums
 L'inferno o l'anima (1999)
 De lo tanto que te amo (2007)

References
"Amo Di Te – Julio Iglesias Jr & Anamor", Magic Music Magazine, February 8, 2014. Retrieved August 15, 2015

External links
 Official web site
 

Living people
Year of birth missing (living people)
Italian women singers
Italian actresses
Italian people of Cuban descent
People of Calabrian descent